The Tripartite class is a class of minehunters developed from an agreement between the navies of Belgium, France and the Netherlands. A total of 35 ships were constructed for the three navies. The class was constructed in the 1980s–1990s in all three countries, using a mix of minehunting, electrical and propulsion systems from the three member nations. In France, where they are known as the Éridan class they are primarily used as minehunters, but have been used for minesweeping and ammunition transport in Belgium and the Netherlands, where the Tripartites are known as the Alkmaar class.

In 1992, the Pakistan Navy acquired three vessels from France, one that was already built, one to be built in France and one built in France and Pakistan. Known as the Munsif class, all three are still in service. The Indonesian Navy acquired two minehunters in the 1990s from the Dutch to a modified design. Known as the Pulau Rengat class, the two ships are still in service. In 1997, France purchased three of the Belgian vessels. In 2007, the Latvian Naval Forces acquired five ships from the Netherlands which had been taken out of service at the beginning of the decade. The Bulgarian Navy acquired a former Belgian minehunter in 2007. The Netherlands and Belgium had a competition in 2018 to build a replacement class for their Tripartite/Alkmaar-class ships.

Design and development
A joint venture of the navies of France, Belgium, and the Netherlands, the Tripartite class of minehunters were a follow on design to the French s. All three nations would build their own hulls while each country was responsible for a different aspect of the vessels; France provided the minehunting and electronic systems, the Netherlands provided the main propulsion systems and Belgium supplied the minehunting propulsion system as well as the electrical generating systems. Each country intended to order 15 of the vessels, with Belgium's initial order being 10 with the option of 5 more. However, France cut their initial order to ten due to budgetary reasons.

Ships

France

In France the class is known as the Éridan class. Each hull was created from fibreglass, moulded in a steel shell. A  container can be stored aboard the ships for additional supply room. The minehunters had an initial complement of 55, this was later reduced to 49.

The Éridan-class minehunters have two independent propulsion systems. In normal operations the minehunters are powered by a  Brons-Werkspoor (later Wärtsilä) A-RUB 215V-12 diesel engine turning one shaft with a LIPS controllable pitch propeller. For use when minehunting the vessels have two  ACEC active rudders and a bow thruster. These are energised by three Astazou IVB gas turbine alternators rated at 150 kW. A fourth diesel-driven alternator rated at 160 kW supplies power during normal operations. Both systems can be operated from the bridge or from a soundproof control centre above the main deck.

The sonar was retracted during normal operations. The vessel was also equipped with Racal Decca 1229 radar. The vessels carried two ECA PAP 104 remotely operated underwater vehicles (ROVs). In 2001, the minesweepers underwent modernisation and the sonar was replaced with the TUS 2022 Mk III type, the radar with the Bridgemaster E250 type and a TSM 2061 combat data system and a Bofors Double Eagle Mk2 ROV were fitted.

The minehunters also mount one  machine gun and two  machine guns. The French vessels have limited minesweeping ability and were initially only fitted with mechanical sweep gear. In 1985, the Éridan class received AP4 acoustic sweep gear. 

The initial order of ten was constructed for the French Navy in the 1980s by the Arsenal de Lorient. After the sale of Sagittaire to Pakistan in 1992, a replacement hull bearing the same name and hull number was constructed. Three Belgian versions of the class were acquired between March and August 1997.

Belgium

Originally ten ships were ordered for the Belgian Navy, with the option for five more that was never activated. The Polyship consortium was organised to direct the building programme, however the consortium was dissolved, leading to delays in the construction of the minehunters. This led to the vessels being reordered this time from Béliard Shipyard, which constructed the hulls at their yard in Ostend, Belgium before completing the minehunters at Rupelmonde. They are equipped with an Atlas Elektronik IMCMS combat data system. When minehunting, the Belgian vessels carry six divers and can have a portable decompression chamber installed abaft the forecastle break.

All vessels in the class are named after flowers and are thus sometimes called the "Flower" or Aster class. In 2001 the remaining Belgian minehunters had their engines upgraded. All remaining Belgian vessels have undergone an extensive upgrade during 2004–2008 involving replacement of the anti-mine warfare equipment. This included receiving the same sonar package as the French versions. The complement of the Belgian ships varies between 33 and 46 depending on mission.

In 1993, three of the vessels (Iris, Fuschia and Dianthus) were paid off and laid up until being sold in 1997 to France. Crocus was modified into an ammunition transfer vessel the same year. Myosotis was converted to an ammunition transport before being taken out of service in 2004 and was sold to Bulgaria in 2009.

Netherlands

In the Royal Netherlands Navy, the Tripartites are known as the Alkmaar class. The 20 mm gun that was initially mounted was removed, leaving only three 12.7 mm machine guns. Beginning in 2003, the remaining Dutch Alkmaar-class minehunters were upgraded with improved electronics, including Atlas Elektronik INCMS combat data system, Thales 2022 Mk III hull-mounted sonar, Atlas Seafox Mine Identification and Disposal System and a Double Eagle Mk III Mod 1 ROV.

The minehunters were constructed at the Van der Giessen-de-Noord yard in Amsterdam, a specially constructed site completed in 1978. Middelburg and Hellevoetsluis were optioned by Egypt, but due to financial issues, were instead completed for the Royal Netherlands Navy. Two ships of a modified design were built for the Indonesian Navy which led to the delay of Vlaardingen and Willemstads construction.

In 2000, three ships (Alkmaar, Delfzijl and Dordrecht) were withdrawn from service, followed by two more (Harlingen and Scheveningen) in 2003. All five were sold to Latvia with handovers beginning in 2007. Four more ships, (Haarlem, Maassluis, Middelburg and Hellevoetsluis) were decommissioned in 2011 following a series of deep budget cuts to the navy. Two of them (Maassluis and Hellevoetsluis) were sold to Bulgaria in 2019. In 2021 it was indicated that a further two ships would be sold to Pakistan. Haarlem and Middelburg were transported via a heavy-lift ship to Pakistan in late 2022.

Export

Bulgaria
The Bulgarian Navy acquired one Tripartite-class minehunter from Belgium in 2007 and two from the Netherlands in 2019. The ex-Myosotis was transferred in 2009 and renamed .  The ex-Maasluis and ex-Hellevoetsluis were transferred in 2020 and renamed Mesta and Struma, respectively.

Indonesia

The Indonesian Navy ordered two minehunters based on the Alkmaar class from the Netherlands on 29 March 1985. They have a different layout than European Tripartite minehunters due to their mission profile being larger, with the vessels intended to operate as minehunters, minesweepers and patrol ships. The minehunters are also equipped with two  bow thrusters and two retractable Schottel  rudder propellers energised by three Turbomecca gas turbine generators.

The Pulau Rengat class mounts two Rheinmetall 20 mm guns and have the capability to have Matra Simbad surface-to-air missile launchers installed or a third 20 mm gun. The Pulau Rengats are equipped with OD3 Oropesa mechanical sweep gear, Fiskar F82 magnetic sweep and SA Marine AS 203 acoustic sweep gear for minesweeping duties. They also have an Ibis V minehunting system and two PAP 104 Mk 4 mine disposal systems along with the Signaal SEWACCO-RI combat data system, Racal Decca AC 1229C radar and Thomson Sintra TSM 2022 sonar. The ships have a complement of 46.

Initially, Indonesia intended to order ten hulls. However, funds were lacking and only two were built. The first was ordered on 29 March 1985 and the second on 30 August 1985. The two ships were initially part of the Royal Netherlands Navy production and were given Dutch names. They were renamed upon sale to Indonesia.

Latvia

In 2007, the Latvian Naval Forces acquired five Alkmaar-class minehunters (Alkmaar, Delfzijl, Dordrecht, Harlingen and Scheveningen) from the Royal Netherlands Navy. These five use the Signaal Sewaaco IX combat data system and the Thomson Sintra DUBM 21A sonar. Harlingen was the first handed over and renamed  on 6 March 2007, followed by Scheveningen on 5 September 2007 which was renamed . Dordrecht was handed over in January 2008 and renamed  and Delfzijl in October 2008 and renamed . Alkmaar was the last to transfer in June 2009 and was renamed . In 2020, the Latvian Naval Forces signed contract with ECA Group for the modernization of three of its Alkmaar-class minehunters, replacing the conventional detection system based on a hull sonar for mines with a smaller unmanned system consisting of the underwater drones AUV A18-M for detection and underwater robots Seascan MK2 and K-STER C for identification and clearance of the mines.

Pakistan
On 17 January 1992, Pakistan signed an agreement with France acquiring three Éridan-class minehunters, one of which was already built, one to be constructed in France and the third in Pakistan. Sagittaire, which was on duty in the Persian Gulf, sailed to Pakistan in November 1992. In Pakistan Navy service, the three ships have Elesco MKR 400 acoustic sweep and MKR 960 magnetic sweeps for minesweeping duties.

The class is known as the Munsif class in Pakistan Navy service. The first of the class Munsif sailed to Pakistan from the Persian Gulf. The second, Muhafiz was delivered in April 1996 and the third was carried aboard a transporter ship in April 1995 to be completed in Pakistan.  A further two ships were bought from the Netherlands in 2021. Haarlem and Middelburg, were transported via a heavy-lift ship to Pakistan in late 2022.

Ukraine
On a visit to the port cities of Mykolaiv and Odesa, Dutch Ministry of Defence Kajsa Ollongren announced that two ships will be donated to the Ukrainian Navy after the Russian invasion of Ukraine has ended. The two ships will help clear out mines on shipping lanes in the Black Sea. Which two ships will be send to Ukraine is still unclear. The ships are slated to be delivered by 2025.

Successor

The Netherlands and Belgium
The Netherlands and Belgium are doing a joint procurement for the replacements of the Tripartite-class/Alkmaar-class minehunters. Both countries want to procure six new mine countermeasure (MCM) vessels, which makes for a total of 12 MCM ships. The new MCM ships will include a range of unmanned systems including unmanned surface, aerial and underwater vehicles alongside towed sonars and mine identification and neutralization ROVs.

Belgium gave the green-light to start the procurement on 26 January 2018 and approved a budget of 1.1 billion euros for the six Belgian MCM ships. Besides the Tripartite-class minehunters, the ships will also replace the Belgian logistical support ship .

There were three contenders. A Franco-Belgium consortium made up of French shipbuilders STX France and Socarenam together with Belgium's EDR bid for the 12 new MCM vessels. Their plan included the construction of MCM vessels named Sea Naval Solutions and a multi-role frigate named Deviceseas, which will serve as mothership to the MCM vessels. All ships having a strong focus on autonomous systems operations. France's Naval Group and  established Belgian subsidiary Naval & Robotics to bid for the program. The third group was Imtech Belgium and Damen Group.

On 15 March 2019, the team led by Naval Group was selected to produce the 12 new vessels.

See also
 Minehunter classes in service

Citations

References

External links

 Belgian navy page with technical specifications
 Dutch navy page about mine hunters (in Dutch)
 World Navies – list of ships in each navy

Mine warfare vessel classes
 
 
 
 
 
 
 
 
Belgium–Netherlands relations
Belgium–France relations
France–Netherlands military relations
Ship classes of the French Navy